Mida Woremo (Amharic: ሚዳ ወረሞ) is one of the woredas in the Amhara Region of Ethiopia. Part of the Semien Shewa Zone, Mida Woremo is bordered on the south by the Qechene River which separates it from Merhabiete, on the west by the Oromia Region, and on the north and east by the Debub Wollo Zone; the northern boundary is defined by the Walaqa River. The administrative center of this woreda is Meragna; other towns include Rema.

This woreda was originally named Weremo Wajetuna Midarema, which is the name used in the 1994 national census; it was changed before the Ethiopian Agricultural Sample Survey in October 2001, which used the present name.

, 1000 households in Rema receive electricity from solar generation, free of charge. This project is funded by Stiftung Solarenergie, a German foundation promoting solar energy.

Demographics
Based on the 2007 national census conducted by the Central Statistical Agency of Ethiopia (CSA), this woreda has a total population of 93,729, an increase of 36.66% over the 1994 census, of whom 47,074 are men and 46,655 women; 7,049 or 7.52% are urban inhabitants. With an area of 836.81 square kilometers, Mida Woremo has a population density of 112.01, which is less than the Zone average of 115.3 persons per square kilometer. A total of 22,521 households were counted in this woreda, resulting in an average of 4.16 persons to a household, and 21,676 housing units. The majority of the inhabitants practiced Ethiopian Orthodox Christianity, with 88.41% reporting that as their religion, while 11.51% of the population said they were Muslim.

The 1994 national census reported a total population for this woreda of 73,809 in 16,289 households, of whom 36,563 were men and 37,246 were women; 3,809 or 5.16% of its population were urban dwellers. The largest ethnic group reported in Mida Woremo was the Amhara (99.79%), and Amharic was spoken as a first language by 99.8%. The majority of the inhabitants practiced Ethiopian Orthodox Christianity, with 88.43% reporting that as their religion, while 11.47% were Muslim.

Notes

Districts of Amhara Region